Fakta is a monthly business and professional magazine published in Helsinki, Finland. It has been in circulation since 1981.

History and profile
Fakta was established in 1981. Its owner was the Finnish publisher A-lehdet Oy. Talentum Media Oy became its owner on 2 February 2004, and Talentum Media Oy, its subsidiary, began to publish the magazine. Fakta is based in Helsinki and provides news on leadership, management, supervisory work and development of organizations. The magazine is published on a monthly basis.

Since 1998 Fakta has cooperated with Harvard Business School and each issue offers a Harvard Management Update supplement covering articles translated from Harvard publications.

The Finnish Periodical Publisher's Association named the editors of Fakta as the editorial staff of the year in 2009. Heidi Hammarsten was the editor-in-chief of the magazine until August 2013 when Reijo Ruokanen was appointed to the post.

See also
List of magazines in Finland

References

External links

1981 establishments in Finland
Business magazines published in Finland
Finnish-language magazines
Magazines established in 1981
Magazines published in Helsinki
Monthly magazines published in Finland